Hou Junjie (born 8 July 1993 in Jingjiang) is a Chinese professional football player who currently plays for Chinese Super League side Guangzhou R&F as a midfielder.

Club career
Hou Junjie started his professional football career in 2011 when he joined Shanghai Zobon for the 2011 China League Two campaign. He transferred to Chinese Super League side Shanghai Shenxin in 2014. He made his league debut for Shanghai Shenxin on 22 March 2014 in a 3–1 home defeat against Guangzhou R&F. He scored his Super League goal on 24 August 2014, which ensured Shanghai Shenxin beat Jiangsu Sainty 3–0.

On 25 February 2016, Hou transferred to fellow Super League side Guangzhou R&F. In August 2016, he was loaned to Hong Kong Premier League side R&F, which was the satellite team of Guangzhou R&F.

Career statistics

Statistics accurate as of match played 31 December 2020.

References

External links
 

1993 births
Living people
Chinese footballers
Footballers from Jiangsu
Pudong Zobon players
Shanghai Shenxin F.C. players
Guangzhou City F.C. players
R&F (Hong Kong) players
Chinese Super League players
Hong Kong Premier League players
Association football midfielders